Choeroichthys sculptus, the sculptured pipefish, is a species of marine fish of the family Syngnathidae.

Description
Choeroichthys sculptus is a small secretive species with a short snout, and with body and tail sections which are approximately equal in length. C. sculptus is dark brown in colour with 2-3 rows of black-margined white spots along its sides with larger white spots along its back and dark spots situated on the lower part of and on either side of the head. The trunk and tail rings show notches between the rings  with conspicuous scutella each of which has a projecting ridge or keel.

Distribution
Choeroichthys sculptus is widely distributed in the Indo-Pacific from the South China Sea, southern Japan, the Northern Mariana Islands, to Samoa. In Australia it is known only from northern Western Australia and the Great Barrier Reef

Habitat and biology
Choeroichthys sculptus is thought to feed mainly on small crustaceans. They are solitary, the sexes are separate and males brood the eggs in an enclosed brood pouch on underside of his body, i.e. this species is ovoviviparous, eventually the eggs hatch and the male gives birth to live young. The female usually lays the eggs in a single layer of two parallel rows within the brood pouch. The larvae are undescribed. It inhabits coral reef flats, mangroves, and seagrass beds.

Naming
The generic name "Choeroichthys" is derived from the Greek  meaning "pig" and  meaning "fish", the specific name sculptus means "to carve" in Latin and refers to the conspicuous keeled scutella.

References

Further reading

Fishes of Australia
ITIS

sculptus
Marine fish
Fish described in 1870
Taxa named by Albert Günther